Charles Polcher Dubuque (July 2, 1932 – February 13, 2020) was a Canadian football player who played for the BC Lions.

References

2020 deaths
1932 births
Players of Canadian football from Alberta
Canadian football running backs
BC Lions players
Canadian football people from Edmonton